Avram David "Avi" Lewis (born May 1967) is a Canadian documentary filmmaker, former host of the Al Jazeera English show Fault Lines and former host of the Canadian Broadcasting Corporation (CBC) current-affairs programs CounterSpin and On the Map.

Biography

Family
Avi Lewis is the great grandson of Moshe Losz (Lewis), an outspoken member of the Jewish Bund who left Svislach, Poland (absorbed by the Soviet Union during World War II, and today in Belarus), after being interrogated by the Russians and threatened with death or the Gulag for his political activity. He left for Montreal in 1921, with his wife Rose (née Lazarovitch) and three children. Avi Lewis is the grandson of former federal New Democratic Party leader David Lewis and the son of former Ontario NDP leader and diplomat Stephen Lewis and journalist Michele Landsberg. Avi Lewis is married to journalist and author Naomi Klein; his sister Ilana Landsberg-Lewis was the executive director of the Stephen Lewis Foundation.

Lewis grew up in Toronto, Ontario, and attended Jarvis Collegiate and Upper Canada College. He graduated from the University of Toronto in 1988.

Lewis was featured on the November 20, 2001, "Life & Times" episode of The Lewis Family.

Avi Lewis's genealogical search was featured on the January 31, 2008, episode of CBC's Who Do You Think You Are?

Career
Between 1996 and 1998, Avi Lewis was host of The NewMusic, a music magazine show on MuchMusic and Citytv. He also served as MuchMusic's political specialist — by doing extensive special events coverage for the channel designed to engage youth in the political process. Among other events, he covered the 1993 Canadian federal election and the 1995 Quebec referendum. Avi Lewis won a Gemini for Best Event Coverage.

In 1998–2001, Lewis hosted CBC Newsworld's current affairs discussion show counterSpin, where he presided over 500 debates. Avi Lewis was later the host of Counterspin Sunday.

In 2004, Lewis and his wife Naomi Klein collaborated on The Take — a documentary that detailed the "recovered factory" movement in Argentina. The Take, winner of the International Jury Prize, was nominated for four Gemini Awards.

Lewis began hosting CBC Newsworld's The Big Picture with Avi Lewis in the autumn of 2006 and On the Map in 2007. He became host of Frontline USA for Al Jazeera television in 2008. Lewis was a participant in CBC's Canada Reads 2009 (see below).

Lewis directed the 2015 feature-length documentary This Changes Everything, which finished second in the audience voting, for the documentary category, at the 2015 Toronto International Film Festival.

On the Map
In June 2007, CBC Newsworld debuted On the Map with Avi Lewis, a daily (Monday-Thursday) half-hour of international news commentary. Lewis discussed such issues as the "Oil Law" that the United States wished Iraq to adopt, women in Afghanistan, and what exactly is meant by the phrase "ungoverned spaces". The show was officially renewed for November 2007 and then disappeared without ever airing again. On the Map'''s half-hour time slot was replaced with a half-hour summary of the daily hour-long show Politics by Don Newman.

During the same time period, The Hour, which had a mix of news commentary and pop culture and provided a lighter fare than On the Map, became decidedly more oriented to pop culture - even though there has been some creep towards greater news commentary as the season progressed. George Stroumboulopoulos stated during the opening show, that the modification of format was because The Hour would now be shown right after The National (rather than before in previous seasons) when shown on the CBC main channel.The Big Picture with Avi Lewis  CBC.ca 

Lewis conducted a June 11, 2007, interview with political writer Ayaan Hirsi Ali. After repeatedly and openly sniggering at Hirsi Ali's complimentary remarks about the United States, Lewis sharply questioned some of her views - including her denial of the existence of Islamophobia, her belief that Islam was inherently misogynistic, and her positive opinions concerning American democracy. Lewis compared Islamophobia to Anti-Semitism, seeing both as equally real, to which Ali replied: "Racism is a universal trait, so is antisemitism, by the way. But I want us not to confuse a set of beliefs such as Islam, with ethnicity such as the hatred against Jews just because they are Jews, or against blacks just because they are black, or against gays just because of- it's something you can't do anything about. Whereas Islam is simply a set of beliefs, and it's not Islamophobic to say ... this is being done in the name of your religion." The interview provoked a strongly critical response from right-wing commentators in the US and Canada.

Lewis has stated  that Hugo Chávez's actions do not match his rhetoric and has criticized Chávez for not doing more to close down the "laboratory" of policies which he had inherited from previous administrations. Naomi Klein, who credited Avi Lewis for his input into her book The Shock Doctrine, links both stifling of dissent and concentration of power with the implementation of these earlier economic policies.

Why Democracy?
From October 8–18, 2007, Avi Lewis hosted the ten-part international documentary series Why Democracy? in Canada.

Frontline USA / Inside USAInside USA was first telecast on Al Jazeera on February 8, 2008, with the episode "Politics of Race". Al Jazeera describes Inside USA as "an in-depth look at the real issues at stake in the US presidential election."Politics Of Race (February 22, 2008) focused on the situation in New Orleans and the disenfranchising of Black voters.Inside USA - Politics of Race - 22 Feb 08 - Pt 2, YouTubeNative Americans (March 1, 2008) focused on Lakota Sioux separatism, social and economic issues surrounding the Lakota Sioux, Navajo and the Shoshone peoples. The last few minutes were devoted to the role online videos play in the American election - including a clip from "Yes We Can".

Canada Reads
Lewis was a panelist in CBC's Canada Reads, which aired on March 2–6, 2009. Canada Reads is a seasonal show in which celebrities choose a book and advocate on its behalf. He presented, and successfully defended, the winning book, Lawrence Hill's The Book of Negroes.

Leap Manifesto
In September 2015, Lewis, Naomi Klein, and others launched the Leap Manifesto - which proposed broad changes to Canadian society and economics in order to respond to climate change through a policy framework that also addresses issues of wealth and income inequality, racism, and colonialism and in hopes of influencing the policy debate during the 2015 Canadian federal election campaign. In 2016, Lewis spearheaded a motion at the New Democratic Party of Canada's federal election which would have had the party endorse the manifesto - in the end, the motion was amended to refer the manifesto to constituency associations for debate. Lewis and other manifesto signatories launched an organization to promote the manifesto's vision in 2017, called The Leap, which operated until 2021 and was a key convenor of Canada's Pact for a Green New Deal in 2019.

 Electoral politics 
In May 2021, Lewis was nominated as the NDP's candidate for West Vancouver—Sunshine Coast—Sea to Sky Country, British Columbia for the 2021 Canadian federal election, which was subsequently called for September 20, 2021. Lewis' run for federal parliament was endorsed by environmentalist David Suzuki, actress Jane Fonda, playwright Eve Ensler, folk singer and activist Billy Bragg, and biologist Alexandra Morton. He came in third behind incumbent Liberal Patrick Weiler who has represented the riding since 2019 and Conservative John Weston, who had previously represented the district from 2008 until 2015.

References

External links
 CBC Digital Archives – Avi Lewis, Canada Reads advocate
 
 100 Days of Resistance: Al Jazeera’s Avi Lewis Reports from Honduras - video report by Democracy Now!''

1967 births
Living people
Canadian television journalists
Film directors from Toronto
Jewish Canadian journalists
Journalists from Toronto
University of Toronto alumni
Upper Canada College alumni
Avi
Canadian people of Belarusian-Jewish descent
Canadian political journalists
People from the Sunshine Coast Regional District
Jewish Canadian filmmakers
New Democratic Party candidates for the Canadian House of Commons
Place of birth missing (living people)